Henricus contrastana, the contrasting henricus moth, is a species of moth of the  family Tortricidae. It is found from Michigan and Connecticut to Florida, in the south west to California.

The wingspan is 17–21 mm. The forewings are dark grey at the base and in a strip along the inner margin. The colour is mostly whitish or cream elsewhere. The hindwings are pale grey with a yellowish tinge. Adults have been recorded on wing from April to July.

References

Moths described in 1907
Henricus (moth)